Mount Nebo Baptist Church is a historic Southern Baptist church located at Pilot Grove, Cooper County, Missouri. It was built in 1856, and is a one-story, antebellum, braced frame, Southern Protestant Church with restrained Greek Revival style detailing. The congregation of the church refurbished and added on in 1856, but the congregation existed since 1820.

Mount Nebo Baptist Church was listed on the National Register of Historic Places in 1990.

References

Churches on the National Register of Historic Places in Missouri
Churches completed in 1856
1820 establishments in Missouri Territory
Baptist churches in Missouri
Greek Revival church buildings in Missouri
National Register of Historic Places in Cooper County, Missouri
Southern Baptist Convention churches